Benjamin Kanuric (born 26 February 2003) is an Austrian professional footballer who plays as a midfielder for  club Arminia Bielefeld.

Club career
Kanuric is a youth product of LASK, Red Bull Salzburg, Liefering and Deutz 05. He moved to Rapid Wien in 2019 and began his professional career with their reserves in 2020, signing a professional contract with them. He debuted for their senior team in a 1–1 Austrian Bundesliga tie with LASK on 31 July 2021.

Kanuric joined German club Arminia Bielefeld, newly relegated to the 2. Bundesliga, in July 2022.

International career
Kanuric was born in Austria and is of Bosnian descent. He is a youth international for Austria, having represented them from all levels from U15 to U19.

References

External links
 
 OEFB Profile

2003 births
Living people
People from Linz-Land District
Austrian people of Bosnia and Herzegovina descent
Footballers from Upper Austria
Austrian footballers
Association football midfielders
Austria youth international footballers
Austrian Football Bundesliga players
2. Liga (Austria) players
Austrian Regionalliga players
SK Rapid Wien players
Arminia Bielefeld players
Austrian expatriate footballers
Austrian expatriate sportspeople in Germany
Expatriate footballers in Germany